Plan Rubber was the codename given to military plans of the United States for the occupation of the Northern coast of Brazil during World War II. The plan was raised in response to concerns that Brazil would enter the war on the side of the Axis, or would at least act in a  manner sympathetic to the Axis cause.

Plan Rubber – The US Invasion of Brazil, February 1942 Records of the Office of the Chief of Naval Operations, Plans, Orders & Related Documents, CINCLANT Oct 1941 to Dec 1942, Box 16. Rubber Plan 

A glance at a map of the world shows Brazil's strategic location as far as a crossing of the Atlantic is concerned. The northeastern tip of Brazil allows the shortest crossing point to French West Africa and Sierra Leone. In 1939, the United States drafted War Plan Rainbow, and one of its tenets was that northeastern Brazil would be secured and available as a staging point for trans-Atlantic travel to Africa and onwards into Europe and the Middle East, and yet further into the Far East and China (at this point, the United States was deeply concerned with Japanese involvement in China and a second route to that theatre independent of the Pacific was essential).

As the US entered the war, it was believed in Washington that the security of northeastern Brazil could not be guaranteed, and that the area and possibly the entire country could side with the Nazis. The reasoning behind this was complex, but there were two essential elements: first, Brazil was not a democracy, but was instead a dictatorship ruled by Getúlio Vargas. Having staged a revolution in the early 1930s, in 1937 Vargas had proclaimed the Estado Novo, a dictatorship with some characters similar to fascist ones. This invited obvious parallels with Italy and Spain, and to an extent Nazi Germany. Vargas was also proud of his country's independence, and this spawned the second factor. In late 1941, the US requested the use of Brazilian bases for air operations, and to send troops to guard these Brazilian bases against sabotage. Vargas saw this as an affront to his nation's sovereignty and refused. In Washington, this may have been interpreted as a resistance to the US rather than national pride. Hence doubt as to Vargas's (and hence Brazil's) allegiance was founded.

There may also have been some truth to the fear that Brazil, or at least its military, would side with the Nazis. The bulk of Brazil's military were based in the southern part of the country, with the northern part being relatively secure and thinly defended. Whilst the navy and air force were generally regarded as pro-Allied (unsurprising, considering the close ties that each had formed with the British Royal Navy and the United States Army Air Force respectively), there was a considerable degree of support for the strong military example of Nazi Germany amongst the officer corps of the Brazilian army, based mainly in the South. A report by the Office of Strategic Services estimated that some 70 per cent of the officer corps were pro-Nazi, and senior government ministers were also believed to be of the same persuasion. Another factor was the large German expatriate population of some 1.5 million, most of whom resided in the southern part of Brazil.

The fall of France and the spectre of a German seizure of Vichy French territories in West Africa completed the picture. US planners believed that the German failure to capture Moscow in 1941 could lead to expeditions on the opposite flank, with a drive through Spain and Portugal, coupled with the seizure of Vichy French territory in Africa, bringing Brazil within range of German aircraft. A credible scenario involving German troops (or at least "5th columnists" landed by air from Dakar), combined with the mobilization of pro-Nazi elements of the Brazilian armed forces was postulated. Thus, in the days after Pearl Harbor, the US drew up plans to forestall any attempt to secure northeast Brazil for the Axis by seizing it themselves, and the "Rubber Plan" was born.

"Rubber Plan" 

The full title of the plan was the "Joint Basic Plan for the Occupation of Northern Brazil [Joint], Serial 737 of 21 December 1941". The initial part of the plan, covering the amphibious operation that would seize several key ports and airports, had a shorter title, "Plan Rubber". The aim of Plan Rubber was to land U. S. Marines in Brazil and on an outlying island to secure the vital airfields. The primary target was the airport at Natal, the primary airfield in the transatlantic link. Other mainland targets were Salvador in the south and Belém in the north, and also Fernando de Noronha Island. All three of the mainland sites had airfields or airports capable of taking B17 bombers and large transport aircraft.  Fernando de Noronha Island had a smaller airfield, but this had been built and was operated by the Italian airline Ala Littoria. Its strategic location flanking the sea routes to Recife and Salvador and the possibility of Axis aircraft using it as a staging post made the airfield a vital target. Two other targets were deemed a priority, namely the airfields at Fortaleza and Recife, although they were not to be assaulted from the sea.

Unfortunately, geography was against the planners from the start. With the exception of Salvador (which featured wide sandy beaches), the littorals around Natal, Belém and Fernando de Noronha were almost totally unsuited to amphibious operations. At Natal, the beaches were sandy and shallow (ideal in themselves for landing craft), but were screened by a treacherous reef that was gaped only in six places. Landing craft would have to be launched nearly 9 miles offshore because of the reef. Finding the six gaps was likely to be difficult enough. At Belém the situation was worse; the best beaches were several miles from the city and were separated from it by miles of impassable swamp. Apart from the docks at Belém itself, the only suitable landing points were some suitable beaches closer to the city, but these could only be reached by landing craft, and this only after an 8-mile journey upriver, and were overlooked from the heights surrounding the city. If these heights were defended in any strength, the landings would be extremely hazardous. Finally, Fernando de Noronha Island had only a single beach that could be used, it was only 200 yards wide and was swept by a particularly severe swell.  Even an unopposed landing would have been treacherous; if well-defended, the beach could become a bloody killing ground. Geography was also the reason why Fortaleza and Recife could not be taken from the sea; Fortaleza was surrounded by impassable terrain, whilst Recife was completely defended by reefs (the name Recife is derived from the Portuguese word for reef). Both would have to be secured by land offensives mounted from Natal after the initial landings.

Despite the significant problems that the geography presented, planning went ahead. The United States Atlantic Fleet would provide cover to the assault force, as well as shore bombardment from the battleship  and air support from the carrier  (which could have embarked Marine Corps aviation squadrons tasked with ground attack in addition to her naval aircraft). The 5th Marine Division and the 9th US Army Division were allocated to the plan and began training for the expected amphibious assaults. In January 1942, troops from the 1st US Infantry Division and the 1st Marine Division staged an exercise at Cape Henry, Virginia, in conditions that were more benign to those that could be expected at Recife. The result was a disaster, with navigation from ship to shore a particular problem; troops became scattered all along the beaches, organization broke down and control was lost. In the eyes of the umpiring staff, the assault was a total failure, despite a 4:1 advantage over the nominal defending force. What was worse, from the perspective of Plan Rubber, was that the boat crews involved in this debacle were the same ones earmarked for the landings in Brazil. However, the exercises did show up some significant weaknesses in the ability to land troops from ships and it is possible that some of these, having been identified, could have been overcome by the time Plan Rubber was executed.

Brazilian forces 

With the forces of nature set against them, it was just as well that the American planners believed the Brazilian military to be sufficiently weak to allow the plan to succeed. At sea, Brazil could muster two British-built battleships, two light cruisers, nine destroyers, three submarines and other small craft. The Brazilian Air Force had nearly 330 aircraft, but many of these were obsolete fighters and bombers. The number of aircraft that were reported as being in service at the time of Plan Rubber were as follows:

Fighters

 Boeing 256 (export version of the Boeing F4B) – 14
 Boeing 69 (export version of the Boeing F2B) – 46

Attack bombers

 Vultee V-11 Bomber – 18
 Vultee V-11 Torpedo Bomber – 12
 North American NA-44 – 6
 Fairey Gordon – 10

Like the Army, the Brazilian Air Force was concentrated mainly in the south, but could be quickly mobilized and sent northward.

In the regions to be seized, the Brazilians could muster about 3500 troops at Natal, 2900 at Fortaleza, 5500 at Recife, 3500 at Salvador and 1300 at Belém. Fernando de Noronha was a penal colony with only 65 guards, 600 inmates and 900 other inhabitants, but its airfield meant it could be reinforced rapidly by air. There were also a number of shore defense installations, but the status of these was largely unknown to US planners, and indeed it is very difficult to get reliable information on them even today. It is known that the Brazilians had drawn up plans for defenses by mounting 12" and 6" guns, supported by mobile batteries with 75 mm guns and machine guns. Whether these were in place at the time Plan Rubber was due to start is a matter of some debate. However, the Brazilians were as aware as anyone of the limitations on littoral operations imposed by their geography and as such it is likely that, had word of Plan Rubber been leaked, that at least some form of defense would have awaited the attacking Americans.

Abandonment of the plan 

No landings by the United States took place in Brazil in 1942. There was a furious level of activity on the diplomatic front that was eventually to persuade President Vargas to allow US troops into Recife, and thus rendered Plan Rubber unnecessary. In December 1941, Under-Secretary Welles persuaded Vargas to allow 150 United States Marines into the airfields at Recife, Natal and Belém, disguised as aircraft mechanics. They were ordered to guarantee the safety and security of the airfields and transiting US aircraft, but were reminded that they were there under the invitation of the Brazilian authorities. This success sparked a fear that pro-Nazi elements in Brazil might stir up a backlash, but President Roosevelt resisted the urgings of some elements of his military staff to immediately execute Plan Rubber, and instead sought a diplomatic solution. Roosevelt was quick to realise that Vargas needed to maintain the respect of his population, so Roosevelt's moves were slowly and carefully arranged to allow this to happen.

At the very time when the US staff was planning to land troops in Brazil, Roosevelt ordered the export of guns and ammunition to Brazil, which raised the level of support for the Allies amongst the Brazilian government and military. This opened the way for a meeting of Foreign Ministers of the South American nations in January 1942, at which the US urged its neighbors to sever diplomatic relations with Germany. Increasing support for the Allied cause led to Brazil doing just that at the end of the meeting. The culmination of this careful policy was the signing in May 1942 of the Brazilian-American Defense Agreement, which allowed for full American support of the defense of Brazil, and finally (after the sinking of five Brazilian vessels by German submarines) Brazil's entry into the war on the Allied side on 22 August 1942.

See also
 Brazilian Expeditionary Force (FEB)
 United States color-coded war plans

References

Cancelled military operations of World War II
Cancelled military operations involving the United States
Brazil in World War II